The 1984 Lafayette Leopards football team was an American football team that represented Lafayette College as an independent during the 1984 NCAA Division I-AA football season.

In their fourth year under head coach Bill Russo, the Leopards compiled a 5–5 record. Frank Corbo was the team captain.

Lafayette played its home games at Fisher Field on College Hill in Easton, Pennsylvania.

Schedule

References

Lafayette
Lafayette Leopards football seasons
Lafayette Leopards football